Czech national hockey team may refer to:

 Czech Republic men's national field hockey team
 Czech Republic women's national field hockey team
 Czech Republic men's national ice hockey team
 Czech Republic women's national ice hockey team
 Czech Republic men's national inline hockey team